Jorge Luis Yriarte González (born 4 March 2000) is a Venezuelan footballer who plays as a midfielder for Spanish club SD Amorebieta.

Career statistics

Club

Notes

References

2000 births
Living people
Venezuelan footballers
Venezuela under-20 international footballers
Venezuelan expatriate footballers
Association football midfielders
Venezuelan Primera División players
Tercera División players
Tercera Federación players
Asociación Civil Deportivo Lara players
CD Vitoria footballers
SD Amorebieta footballers
Venezuelan expatriate sportspeople in Spain
Expatriate footballers in Spain
Sportspeople from Barquisimeto